Moggach is a surname. Notable people with the surname include:

Deborah Moggach (born 1948), English writer and screenwriter
Douglas Moggach, Canadian philosopher
Lottie Moggach, English journalist and author

Scottish Gaelic-language surnames